is a Japanese television drama series that started airing on NHK on September 13, 2011.

Cast
 Hideaki Itō
 Yūichi Nakamaru 
 Shin Yazawa
 Takuya Nagaoka

References

External links
 Official site 

2011 Japanese television series debuts
2011 Japanese television series endings
NHK original programming
Japanese drama television series